CH4 most commonly refers to the chemical formula for methane.

CH4 may also denote:
a postcode subdistrict of Chester, United Kingdom
the CH-4 variant of the Cessna CH-1 Skyhook helicopter
the CH-4 variant of the CASC Rainbow unmanned aerial vehicle
Channel 4 (disambiguation)
Church Hymnary 4th edition